The lobster-tailed pot helmet, also known as the zischägge, horseman's pot and harquebusier's pot, was a type of post-Renaissance combat helmet. It became popular in Europe, especially for cavalry and officers, from c. 1600; it was derived from an Ottoman Turkish helmet type. The helmet gradually fell out of use in most of Europe in the late 17th century; however, the Austrian heavy cavalry retained it for some campaigns as late as the 1780s.

Origin

The lobster-tailed pot helmet had an oriental origin, being derived from the Ottoman Turkish çiçak (pronounced 'chichak', Turkish – çiçek Çiçek means flower in Turkish which is attributed to the shape of the helmets top side) helmet, which developed in the 16th century. It was adopted by the Christian states of Europe in the early 17th century. The chichak was almost identical to the later European helmets – it had a forward projecting peak, sliding bar nasal, cheekpieces and neck guard; only its tendency to have a conical rather than rounded skull was distinctive. The European derivative of this helmet saw widespread use during the Thirty Years War when it became known as the zischägge, a Germanisation of the original Turkish name.

Characteristics

The lobster-tailed pot had a rounded skull-piece, which was sometimes fluted. The skulls of English-made helmets were usually formed from two sections, joined by a raised comb running from front to back; the skulls of helmets manufactured on the continent were most often raised from a single-piece of metal. Cheekpieces, commonly made in one piece but occasionally articulated, were attached to the skull by leather strapping; however, the better quality examples are sometimes hinged. To protect the face there was either a fixed forward projecting peak that incorporated a sliding nasal bar retained by a large screw, or a hinged peak with three attached bars. Finally, the helmet had a laminated defence (or a single-piece of plate ridged to imitate separate lames) to protect the back of the head and neck that was said to resemble the tail of a lobster. Another common name for the helmet was the "harquebusier's pot", the harquebusier being the most common type of cavalry in Western Europe during the 17th century. The single nasal-bar type was characteristic of Continental Europe, whilst the three-barred type with a pivoting peak was more widely used in the British Isles. Many European-made lobster-tailed pot helmets were later imported to Britain during the English Civil War. Occasionally, older helmets like the burgonet or sallet were modified to resemble the 'lobster-pot.' As stated by General George Monck in 1644, the "headpiece with three small bars" was intended to be pistol-proof.

Decoration and appearance

The appearance and finish of lobster-tailed pots varied greatly, from the highly decorated, superb-quality examples made for individual commanders down to crudely executed "munition-quality" types, which were mass-produced to equip large numbers of ordinary cavalry troopers. High quality helmets could be decorated using a range of techniques, including repoussé, engraving and blue-and-gilt finishes. An extant helmet made for King James II of England had the three bar face defence replaced by a pierced openwork plate depicting the full royal arms of England, sight being afforded by spaces within the design. Many helmets were blackened or browned as a treatment to weatherproof them and protect against rust. The better quality helmets given this treatment would often have had their sombre appearance relieved by the use of numerous gilded rivet heads. Some of the most flamboyantly decorated helmets were produced for the Polish winged hussars, with metal crests and enlarged, decoratively shaped, nasals being not uncommon. A number of extant helmets have tubular plume-holders attached, this, taken with the evidence of contemporary illustrations, indicates the use of feather plumes.

Use

This form of helmet was widely used during the Thirty Years War and the English Civil War; it was commonly known as a zischägge in Germany and a 'horseman's pot' or 'three-barred pot' in Britain; the term 'lobster-tailed pot' is widely used in modern scholarship. The typical cavalryman of the period, the harquebusier, would have worn the helmet with a buff coat, bridle-hand gauntlet and breastplate and backplate. It was also sometimes worn by a more heavily armoured type of cavalry, the cuirassier, combined with three-quarter armour. It was used by cavalry on both sides of the English Civil War including Oliver Cromwell's Ironside cavalry. The common misconception of Cavaliers wearing plumed wide-brimmed hats whilst the Roundheads wore helmets is definitively disproved by a surviving order signed by Charles I himself for 33 'potts', along with other cavalry armour, for the use of his own troop of horse in 1642. Another order, this time from the Parliamentarian authorities, dating to 1644 for 300 "potts with three barres English" indicates that each helmet, no doubt of basic quality, cost 7 shillings.
Similar helmets were worn in the 17th century by Polish winged hussars and were termed "szyszak" in Polish, again a derivative of the original Turkish name. Austrian cuirassiers were equipped with the lobster-tailed pot helmet as late as the 1780s, long after its use had died out elsewhere, when campaigning against the Ottoman Turks.

Gallery

Notes

References 
Blackmore, D. (1990) Arms & Armour of the English Civil Wars, Trustees of the Royal Armouries. 
Brzezinski, R. (McBride, A. - illustrator) (1987) Polish Armies 1569-1696 (1), Osprey Publishing, London.
Bull, S. (1991) An Historical Guide to Arms and Armour, Studio Editions, London,  
Haythornthwaite, P. (1994) The Austrian Army, 1740-1780: Cavalry Osprey Publishing. 
Oakeshott, Ewart (1980) European Weapons and Armour: From the Renaissance to the Industrial Revolution. Lutterworth Press.
Robinson, H.R., (2002) Oriental Armour, Courier Dover Publications. 
Tincey, J. (McBride, A. - illustrator) (1990) Soldiers of the English Civil War (2) Cavalry, Osprey Publishing, 

17th-century introductions
Early Modern helmets
New Model Army
Western plate armour
English Civil War

be:Ерыхонка
ru:Ерихонка